The Homolje Mountains (or ) is a mountain range in eastern Serbia. The region they are in is also known as Homolje and located between towns of Žagubica in the south and Kučevo in the north.

Their highest peaks are Štubej (940 m) and Vranj (884 m). Hidden in the mountains is the Orthodox monastery of Vitovnica.

The region of Homolje is sparsely populated, with ethnic Romanians making a majority of residents in some areas thereof, and because of the small population its nature is unspoilt. One of its attractions is a vast forest called Trest.

References

External links
 Photo tour of Homolje mountains
 Biking tour through homolje

Mountains of Serbia
Serbian Carpathians